En plongée was a 1926 French film directed by Jacques Robert. It was based on Fragments d'épaves, a novel by Bernard Frank. It was shot in Monaco, but set in Brittany. It is a spy film.

It was reviewed in Cinémagazine in 1928.

Cast
Lilian Constantini - La princesse Nouriskine 
Daniel Mendaille - Maurice de Vergnes, un officier de marine 
Pierre Alcover - Howell 
Olga Noël - Anna Guérec de Vergnes, la femme de Maurice 
Mathilde Alberti - Moussia Fedorovna, une espionne, l'ex fiancée de Maurice 
Harry Arbell - Le Bozec 
Claire Darcas - Madame Howell 
Boris de Fast John 
Henri Desmarets - Karl 
Jean Napoléon Michel - Frantz 
Pierre Séguier - Pierre

References

External links
imdb

1926 films
1920s French-language films
Films shot in Monaco
Films set in Brittany
1920s spy films
French spy films
French silent films
French black-and-white films
1920s French films